Mimetus sagittifer is a species of spider in the family Mimetidae. It is endemic to Sri Lanka.

See also 
 List of Mimetidae species

References

Mimetidae
Endemic fauna of Sri Lanka
Spiders of Asia
Spiders described in 1895